Mario Escobar may refer to:
 Mario Escobar (cyclist)
 Mario Escobar (referee)